Rage Magazine was a free urban magazine and the first issue was released in mid-2006. The magazines print-run increased from 10,000 to 80,000 copies, and was found across Canada and the US. Rage was an edgy street magazine with the size format of 9×10", the magazines content was mainly on music and fashion. The magazine had a column by George Jung and collaborator Melissa Auf der Maur. The magazine was free and driven by advertising and campaigns and at from 2006–2008 had the biggest circulation of a free magazine in North America, this because no other free magazines were releasing 80,000 free copies in each country, Canada and the United States.

History
Rage Magazine was founded by Max D Heston, Nelson Dias, Kris Branch in 2006 in a loft of Max D Heston's; the magazine took off and went national within a year. New investors and publishers of tourist magazines, Sebastien Le Montagner and Sylvain Gelinas then bought into the company for $150,000.00. This led to a creative differences between all partners and Max D Heston tried to leave, but with no one to buy his shares he stayed with the company.  

In 2008 shares from Nelson Dias, Sebastien Le Montagner and Sylvain Gelinas were bought by Dubai entrepreneur Fred McFadden, making Max D Heston and Fred McFadden the only shareholders. Later in 2009 the magazine was discontinued due to creative differences between the two remaining partners. 

In March 2010 in an interview with Max D Heston with a McGill University student he stated, "It would be a shame to just kill the magazine, we had zero debt and it was going strong though just tough when you don't get on well with your partners. So we decided to drop it and move on. We may release some special editions of Rage one day if me and Fadi can bring ourselves around to talking to each other again." He also stated " I think the print business is done for now, I mean I will always love magazines though I think its time to move on to more fiction and films".

Rage Magazine released over one million free copies from 2006–2008.

In 2009 The Best Of Rage Magazine was released and sold for US$45.00  on the Rage website with a limited run of 30,000 for sale.

In mid-2011 a smaller pocket book run of Rage Magazine was released for the festivals Osheaga and Coachella. Max D Heston quoted when asked, "You have to whore yourself out now and again, and this is the time to do so".

In 2011 it was announced that Ruckenstein Media would release the magazine changing its name slightly to Rage Magna Carta, none of the original founders will be part of this new venture. 

In 2016 Rage was bought back by its original founder.

In 2017 Rage TV was launched which focuses on interviews, documentaries and films.

Notable content
In 2017 for the relaunch of Rage, founder Max D Heston interviewed Liam Gallagher at Osheaga music festival. The interview touched upon on drugs and the legalization of marijuana in Canada and the United States.

Reception
Issue 5 was nominated for Best Cover at the 2007 Grands Prix in Quebec.

References

External links
 BusinessProfiles.com "Rage Magazine Inc." profile

2006 establishments in Quebec
Lifestyle magazines published in Canada
Magazines established in 2006
Magazines published in Montreal